Matthew 13:1-2 are the first two verses in the thirteenth chapter of the Gospel of Matthew in the New Testament.

Content
In the original Greek according to Westcott-Hort, these verses are:
1: Ἐν δὲ τῇ ἡμέρᾳ ἐκείνῃ ἐξελθὼν ὁ Ἰησοῦς ἀπὸ τῆς οἰκίας ἐκάθητο παρὰ τὴν θάλασσαν.
2: Καὶ συνήχθησαν πρὸς αὐτὸν ὄχλοι πολλοί, ὥστε αὐτὸν εἰς τὸ πλοῖον ἐμβάντα καθῆσθαι· καὶ πᾶς ὁ ὄχλος ἐπὶ τὸν αἰγιαλὸν εἱστήκει.  

In the King James Version of the Bible the text reads:
1: The same day went Jesus out of the house, and sat by the sea side.
2: And great multitudes were gathered together unto him, so that he went into a ship, and sat; and the whole multitude stood on the shore.

The New International Version translates the passage as:
1: That same day Jesus went out of the house and sat by the lake.
2: Such large crowds gathered around him that he got into a boat and sat in it, while all the people stood on the shore.

Analysis
It is believed that after Christ had preached in the house, which He had hired for His dwelling in Capernaum, He sent away the crowds to attend to their affairs, so that He might refresh Himself and His disciples with rest and food. Since He knew that the multitudes were about to come to Him, but that the house could not contain them, He went out to the open shore of the Sea of Galilee and there spoke His parables, using the ship as His pulpit, preaching to the people assembled on the shore.

The Jerusalem Bible states that the opening words, "that same day", have "no chronological significance".

Commentary from the Church Fathers
Augustine: "By the words, The same day, he sufficiently shows that these things either followed immediately upon what had gone before, or that many things could not have intervened; unless indeed ‘day’ here after the Scripture manner signifies a period."

Rabanus Maurus: "For not only the Lord’s words and actions, but His journeyings also, and the places in which He works His mighty works and preaches, are full of heavenly sacraments. After the discourse held in the house, wherein with wicked blasphemy He had been said to have a dæmon, He went out and taught by the sea, to signify that having left Judæa because of their sinful unbelief, He would pass to the salvation of the Gentiles. For the hearts of the Gentiles, long proud and unbelieving, are rightly likened to the swelling and bitter waves of the sea. And who knows not that Judæa was by faith the house of the Lord."

Jerome: "For it must be considered, that the multitude could not enter into the house to Jesus, nor be there where the Apostles heard mysteries; therefore the Lord in mercy to them departed out of the house, and sat near the sea of this world, that great numbers might be gathered to Him, and that they might hear on the sea shore what they were not worthy to hear within; And great multitudes were gathered unto him, so that he went into a ship, and sat down, and all the people stood on the shore."

Chrysostom: "The Evangelist did not relate this without a purpose, but that he might show the Lord’s will therein, who desired so to place the people that He should have none behind Him, but all should be before His face."

Hilary of Poitiers: "There is moreover a reason in the subject of His discourse why the Lord should sit in the ship, and the multitude stand on the shore. For He was about to speak in parables, and by this action signifies that they who were without the Church could have no understanding of the Divine Word. The ship offers a type of the Church, within which the word of life is placed, and is preached to those without, and who as being barren sand cannot understand it."

Jerome: "Jesus is in the midst of the waves; He is beaten to and fro by the waves, and, secure in His majesty, causes His vessel to come nigh the land, that the people not being in danger, not being surrounded by temptations which they could not endure, might stand on the shore with a firm step, to hear what was said."

Rabanus Maurus: "Or, that He went into a ship and sat on the sea, signifies that Christ by faith should enter into the hearts of the Gentiles, and should gather together the Church in the sea, that is in the midst of the nations that spake against Him. And the crowd that stood on the sea shore, neither in the ship nor in the sea, offers a figure of those that receive the word of God, and are by faith separated from the sea, that is from the reprobate, but are not yet imbued with heavenly mysteries. It follows; And he spake many things unto them in parables."

See also
Jesus preaches in a ship
Sea of Galilee

References

External links
Other translations of Matthew 13:1 at BibleHub
Other translations of Matthew 13:2 at BibleHub

13:2